Norman Guttman (1920–1984) was an American psychologist who played a major role in developing scientifically validated operant conditioning methods. He was a student of B. F. Skinner at the University of Minnesota and became prominent in his field.

External links 
 Inventory of the Norman Guttman Papers.  University Archives, Duke University

1920 births
1984 deaths
20th-century American psychologists
University of Minnesota alumni